Selenomonas lacticifex is a species of anaerobic, Gram-negative, rod-shaped bacteria first isolated from spoilt beer.

References

Further reading

Jay, James Monroe. Modern food microbiology. No. Ed. 5. Chapman & Hall., 1996.

External links

LPSN
Type strain of Selenomonas lacticifex at BacDive -  the Bacterial Diversity Metadatabase

Negativicutes
Bacteria described in 1990